Chima Michail Onyeike (born 21 June 1975) is a Dutch football coach and former professional player.

Early and personal life
Onyeike was born in Zeist, Netherlands; his father is Nigerian. His brother Obi is also a footballer; both brothers have played for FC Dordrecht.

Career

Playing career
Born in Zeist, Onyeike played for DEV, WGW, HRC, HFC Haarlem, Dordrecht, Excelsior, VVV-Venlo, TOP Oss, Cambuur and Quick Boys. After leaving Dordrecht in the summer of 2004, he went on trial with Volendam in September 2004. He then signed for Cambuur in October 2004.

Coaching career
After retiring from playing, Onyeike attended a sport's university to obtain his diploma in fitness. He then began work as a personal training, working with players such as Roy Makaay and Aleksandr Kerzhakov.

In July 2011, he became the fitness coach at Russian club Anzhi Makhachkala.

In June 2013, he became the fitness coach at Greek club PAOK. On 25 November 2014 he started to work as fitness coach for VfB Stuttgart.

References

1975 births
Living people
Dutch footballers
Dutch people of Nigerian descent
People from Zeist
Association football forwards
HFC Haarlem players
FC Dordrecht players
Excelsior Rotterdam players
VVV-Venlo players
TOP Oss players
SC Cambuur players
Quick Boys players
Eerste Divisie players
Dutch expatriate sportspeople in Russia
Dutch expatriate sportspeople in Greece
PAOK FC non-playing staff
Footballers from Utrecht (province)
Association football coaches
Dutch sportspeople of African descent